Henri Michaux (24 May 1899 – 19 October 1984) was a Belgian-born French poet, writer and painter. Michaux is renowned for his strange, highly original poetry and prose, and also for his art: the Paris Museum of Modern Art and the Guggenheim Museum in New York had major shows of his work in 1978 (see below, Visual Arts). His texts chronicling his psychedelic experiments with LSD and mescaline, which include Miserable Miracle and The Major Ordeals of the Mind and the Countless Minor Ones, are well known. So are his idiosyncratic travelogues and books of art criticism. Michaux is also known for his stories about Plume – "a peaceful man" – perhaps the most unenterprising hero in the history of literature, and his many misfortunes. In 1955 he became a citizen of France, and he lived the rest of his life there. He became a friend of Romanian pessimist philosopher and French citizen Emil Cioran around the same time. In 1965 he won the grand prix national des Lettres, which he refused to accept, as he did every honor he was accorded in his life.

Biography

Travels
In 1930 and 1931, Michaux visited Japan, China and India. The result of this trip was the book A Barbarian in Asia. Asian culture became one of his biggest influences. The philosophy of Buddhism and calligraphy later became principal subjects of many of his poems and inspired many of his drawings. He also visited Ecuador and published a travelogue book of the same name. His travels across the Americas finished in Brazil in 1939, and he stayed there for two years.

Visual arts
Michaux was a highly original visual artist, associated with the Tachiste movement in the 1940s and 50s. His work often makes use of dense, suggestively gestural strokes that incorporates elements of calligraphy, asemic writing, and abstract expressionism. The Museum of Modern Art in Paris and the Guggenheim Museum in New York both had major shows of his work in 1978.

Works
 Cas de folie circulaire (1922)
 Les Rêves et la Jambe (1923)
 Fables des origines (Disque vert, 1923)
 Qui je fus (1927). Who I Was
 Mes propriétés (Fourcade, 1929). My Properties
 La Jetée (1929)
 Ecuador (1929). Ecuador: A Travel Journal, trans. Robin Magowan (1970)
 Un certain Plume (Editions du Carrefour, 1930; revised 1938 and 1963 as Plume). A Certain Plume, trans. Richard Sieburth (New York Review Books, 2018)
 Un barbare en Asie (1933; revised 1945). A Barbarian in Asia, trans. Sylvia Beach (1949)
 La nuit remue (1935). The Night Moves
 Voyage en Grande Garabagne (1936). Voyage to Great Garaban
 La Ralentie (1937)
 Plume précédé de Lointain Intérieur (1938; revised 1963). Plume preceded by Faraway Within. 1963 edition includes the "Postface"
 Peintures (GLM, 1939). Paintings
 Au pays de la Magie (1941). In the Land of Magic
 Arbres des tropiques (1942)
 Épreuves, Exorcismes (1940-1944). Ordeals, Exorcisms
 Ici, Poddema (1946)
 Peintures et dessins (Le point du jour, 1946)
 Meidosems (Le point du jour, 1948). Meidosems: Poems and Lithographs, trans. Elizabeth R. Jackson (1992)
 Nous deux encore (10 Lambert, 1948)
 Poésie pour pouvoir (René Drouin, 1949)
 Passages (1950)
 Mouvements (recueil) (1952)
 Face aux verrous (1954)
 Misérable Miracle (La mescaline) (1956). Miserable Miracle, trans. Louise Varèse (1963)
 L'Infini turbulent (1957). Infinite Turbulence, trans. Michael Fineberg (1975)
 Paix dans les brisements (1959)
 Connaissance par les gouffres (1961). Light Through Darkness, trans. Haakon Chevalier (1964)
 Vents et Poussières (1962)
 Désagrégation (1965)
 Les Grandes Épreuves de l'esprit et les innombrables petites (1966). The Major Ordeals of the Mind, trans. Richard Howard (1974)
 Vers la complétude saisie et dessaisies (GLM, 1966). Yantra, partial trans. Louise Landes-Levi (Siglio, 2011)
 Façons d'endormi, façons d'éveillé (1969). Ways of Sleepers, Ways of Wakers
 Poteaux d'angle (1971). Tent Posts, trans. Lynn Hoggard (1997)
 En rêvant à partir de peintures énigmatiques (Fata Morgana, 1972). Dreams Like Enigmatic Paintings, trans. Michael Eales (2018)
 Émergences, Résurgences (Skira, 1972)
 Bras cassé (Fata Morgana, 1973)
 Moments, traversées du temps (1973). Moments, Crossings of Time
 Quand tombent les toits (1973)
 Par la voie des rythmes (Fata Morgana, 1974)
 Idéogrammes en Chine (Fata Morgana, 1975). Ideograms in China, trans. Gustaf Sobin (2002)
 Coups d'arrêt (1975)
 Face à ce qui se dérobe (1976)
 Les ravagés (Fata Morgana, 1976)
 Jours de silence (Fata Morgana, 1978)
 Saisir (Fata Morgana, 1979)
 Une voie pour l'insubordination (Fata Morgana, 1980)
 Affrontements (Fata Morgana, 1981)
 Chemins cherchés, chemins perdus, transgressions (1982). Paths Looked For, Paths Lost, Transgressions
 Les commencements (Fata Morgana, 1983)
 Le jardin exalté (Fata Morgana, 1983)
 Par surprise (Fata Morgana, 1983). By Surprise, trans. Randolph Hough (1987)
 Par des traits (Fata Morgana, 1984)
 Déplacements, Dégagements (1985; posthumous). Spaced, Displaced, trans. David and Helen Constantine (1992)
 Rencontres (with Paolo Marinotti) (1991; posthumous)
 Jeux d'encre. Trajet Zao Wou-Ki (1993; posthumous)
 En songeant à l'avenir (1994; posthumous)
 J'excuserais une assemblée anonyme... (1994; posthumous)
 À distance (Mercure de France, 1997; posthumous)
 Sitôt lus. Lettres à Franz Hellens. 1922-1952 (Fayard, 1999; posthumous)
 Paul Klee (Fata Morgana, 2012; posthumous)
 Donc c'est non, lettres réunies, ed. Jean-Luc Outers (Gallimard, 2016; posthumous)
 Coups d'arrêt suivi d’Ineffable vide (Éditions Unes, 2018; posthumous)

Selections prepared by Michaux 

 L'Espace du dedans (1944; revised 1966). Selected Writings: The Space Within, trans. Richard Ellmann (New Directions, 1951; 1968)
 Ailleurs (1948). Compiles Voyage en Grande Garabagne (1936), Au pays de la Magie (1941) and Ici, Poddema (1946)
 La Vie dans les plis (1949). Life in the Folds, trans. Darren Jackson (2016)

Compilations in English 

 Michaux, trans. Teo Savory (Unicorn Press, 1967)
 Henri Michaux: A Selection, trans. Michael Fineberg (1979)
 Darkness Moves: An Henri Michaux Anthology, 1927-1984, ed. David Ball (University of California Press, 1994)
 Someone Wants to Steal My Name and Other Poems, ed. Nin Andrews (2004)
 Stroke by Stroke, trans. Richard Sieburth (2006). Compiles Saisir (1979) and Par des traits (1984) 
 Toward Totality: Selected Works, 1929–1973, trans. Louise Landes-Levi (Shivastan, 2006)
 Thousand Times Broken: Three Books, trans. Gillian Conoley (City Lights, 2014). Compiles 400 Men on the Cross, "Peace in the Breaking", and Watchtowers on Targets
 Storms Under the Skin: Selected Poems, 1927-1954, trans. Jane Draycott (2017)

Further reading 
 Bäckström, Per. Enhet i mångfalden. Henri Michaux och det groteska (Unity in the Plenitude. Henri Michaux and the Grotesque), Lund: Ellerström, 2005.
 Bäckström, Per. Le Grotesque dans l’œuvre d’Henri Michaux. Qui cache son fou, meurt sans voix, Paris: L’Harmattan, 2007.
 Bowie, Malcolm. Henri Michaux: A Study of His Literary Works. Oxford: Clarendon Press, 1973.
 C L Campos, "Michaux, Henri" in Anthony Thorlby (ed). The Penguin Companion to Literature. Penguin Books. 1969. Volume 2 (European Literature). Page 534.
Müller-Yao, Marguerite Hui. Der Einfluß der Kunst der chinesischen Kalligraphie auf die westliche informelle Malerei, Diss. Bonn, Köln 1985. 
 Müller-Yao, Marguerite. "Informelle Malerei und chinesische Kalligrafie", in: Informel, Begegnung und Wandel. (hrsg von Heinz Althöfer, Schriftenreihe des Museums am Ostwall; Bd. 2), Dortmund 2002. .
 Wedewer, Rolf. Die Malerei des Informel. Weltverlust und Ich-Behauptung, Deutscher Kunstverlag, München, 2007. .

References

External links 

 
Reelyredd's Poetry Pages, French text of Michaux poem "Ma Vie" with English translation
 Major paintings of Henri Michaux 

Art Informel and Tachisme painters
1899 births
1984 deaths
Belgian painters
Belgian poets in French
French fantasy writers
Modern painters
People from Namur (city)
Belgian emigrants to France
Naturalized citizens of France
French male poets
20th-century French poets
20th-century French male writers